Lakeland North is a census-designated place (CDP) in King County, Washington, United States. The population was 12,942 at the 2010 census. Part of the community was annexed into neighboring Auburn in 2008.

Geography
Lakeland North is located in southwestern King County at  (47.332822, -122.276997). It is bordered to the east by Auburn, to the south and west by Federal Way, and to the north by Kent. Interstate 5 runs along the west edge of the community, with access from Exit 143 (South 320th Street) at the southwest corner of the CDP and from Exit 147 (South 272nd Street) at the northwest corner. I-5 leads north  to downtown Seattle and south  to Tacoma.

Lake Dolloff is in the southern part of the community, and Star Lake is in the north.

Demographics

At the 2000 census there were 15,085 people, 4,978 households, and 4,101 families in the CDP. The population density was 2,841.4 people per square mile (1,096.9/km²). There were 5,067 housing units at an average density of 954.4/sq mi (368.4/km²).  The racial makup was 82.45% White, 3.41% African American, 1.07% Native American, 6.95% Asian, 0.50% Pacific Islander, 1.62% from other races, and 4.00% from two or more races. Hispanic or Latino of any race were 3.56%.

Of the 4,978 households 43.3% had children under the age of 18 living with them, 68.8% were married couples living together, 8.8% had a female householder with no husband present, and 17.6% were non-families. 12.0% of households were one person and 2.9% were one person aged 65 or older. The average household size was 3.03 and the average family size was 3.29.

The age distribution was 30.0% under the age of 18, 7.0% from 18 to 24, 31.6% from 25 to 44, 24.5% from 45 to 64, and 6.8% 65 or older. The median age was 36 years. For every 100 females there were 98.5 males. For every 100 females age 18 and over, there were 97.3 males.

The median household income was $62,292 and the median family income  was $64,158. Males had a median income of $45,199 versus $31,753 for females. The per capita income was $23,776. About 3.4% of families and 5.1% of the population were below the poverty line, including 5.7% of those under age 18 and 4.2% of those age 65 or over.

References

Census-designated places in King County, Washington